The White Cross is a Grade II listed public house at Riverside, Richmond, in the London Borough of Richmond upon Thames. It was built in the early mid-19th century, and the architect is not known.

References

External links
Official website

19th-century establishments in England
Buildings and structures completed in the 19th century
Grade II listed buildings in the London Borough of Richmond upon Thames
Grade II listed pubs in London
Pubs in the London Borough of Richmond upon Thames
Richmond, London